Spyros Lykoudis (born 1945), a Greek politician, has been a political activist of the Renewing Left for five decades. He was elected a Member of the Hellenic National Parliament with the Democratic Left (DIMAR), assuming office on May 27, 2012, in the 2012 elections. He declared his independence from the Democratic Left in September 2014 and in October 2014 he constituted the Reformers for Democracy and Development.

Career

He was the Secretary of the first Central Committee of the Democratic Left and in the elections 2012 he was elected a State Member of the Hellenic Parliament. In June 2013 the Democratic Left (DIMAR) broke away from the coalition government, which signified a change of the political course of the party. Spyros Lykoudis disagreed in public with the way, the time and the triggering event of the departure. In September 2014 he declared his independence from DIMAR in Parliament. On 21 October 2014 he presented his new political initiative, the Reformers for Democracy and Development in a public event in the Benaki Museum.

On 24 December 2014 the cooperation of the Reformers with the political party The River (To Potani)  was announced in a joint press conference with its Leader Stavros Theodorakis in the Old Parliament. Spyros Lykoudis represents the 1st constituency of Athens as an MP, elected in the 25th January 2015 general elections by The River (To Potami).

(1) 
(2) http://spyroslykoudis.gr
(3) {http://topotami.gr}
(4) http://hellenicparliament.gr

References 

1. www.hellenicparliament.gr

2. Costas Karis- Spyros Lykoudis, They Claim To Support The Government Which They Do Not, I Avghi tis Kyriakis, January 28, 1990

3. Spyros Lykoudis, He Sealed a Generation and The Fights for Peace, Dialoghos, May 10, 1993

4. Costas Poulakidas - Spyros Lykoudis, The Coalition Should Be A Protagonist Not An Observer, Kyriakatiki Avghi, October 28, 1995

5.Spyros Lykoudis, New Age Urges New Policies, Flyaria, November 1, 1995

6. Michalis Mazarakis- Spyros Lykoudis, National Public Dialogue About Education, I Vradini, December 29, 1998

7. Spyros Lykoudis, We Should Be Present, The Avghi Of Sunday, March 29, 1998

8. Spyros Lykoudis, Is That An Action Of Civilisation Or Barbarism?, I Avghi, May 20, 1999

9. Spyros Lykoudis, Miscelleneous, I Avghi, June 3, 1999

10. Spyros Lykoudis, The Presidency, Semitis And The Left, Eleftherotypia, January 4, 2000

11. Spyros Lykoudis, Let's Talk Honestly, I Avghi, 2004

12. Spyros Lykoudis, The Fight For The Left Believes Is ON, I Avghi tis Kyriakis, November 20, 2005

13. 10 Members of the Central Political Committee of the Coalition, The Direction of the Policy and the Plan on the Electoral Entry of the Coalition, I Anagennisi tis Aristeras, Issue 1, June–February 2003

14. 10 Members of the Central Committee of the Coalition, 10 Points of Opinion of the Left Rebirth to the Central Political Opinion, I Anagennisi tis Aristeras, Issue 1, February–June 2003

15. 10 Members of the Central Committee of the Coalition, About the Electoral Policy, I Anagennisi tis Aristeras, Issue 1, February–June 2003

16. Andreas Papadopoulos, The Coalition Should Take The Course We Decided When It Was Born, I Avghi tis Kyriakis, November 7, 2004

17. Voula Kechagia, Is the Turning Backwards 'Left'?, Ta Nea, February 1, 2005

18. Andreas Papadopoulos- Spyros Lykoudis, When A Course does Not Work It Is Changed, It is Not Imposed, I Avghi, June 24, 2005

19. Spyros Lykoudis, Instants 2 -Through The Filming Eyes Of Leonidas Kyrkos , I Avgi, June 7, 2008

20.  Voula Kechagia- Spyros Lykoudis, The Hooded Men Are A Destructive Storm, Ta Nea, January 12, 2009

21. Spyros Lykoudis, Facing European Elections, Politics, May 7, 2009
22. Voula Kechagia, Unfortunately SYRIZA is Looking Backwards, Ta Nea, June 17, 2009

23. Voula Kechagia- Spyros Lykoudis, We Are Not The " Quiet" Left In The Corner, January 18, 2010

24. Andreas Papadopoulos-Spyros Lykoudis, As Far As SYRIZA Is Conerned We Have Limits,  I Avghi, May 9, 2010

25. Nikos Filis- Spyros Lykoudis, Interviewing Spyros Lykoudis, The Secretary Of The Democratic Left, I Avghi,February 19, 2012

26. http://www.topotami.gr/staff/spiros-likoydis-athinon

1945 births
20th-century Greek politicians
Living people
Greek MPs 2012 (May)
Greek MPs 2012–2014
Greek MPs 2015 (February–August)
Greek MPs 2015–2019
Politicians from Athens